Armenia selected their Junior Eurovision Song Contest 2010 entry by a national final. The winner was Vladimir Arzumanyan with "Mama", which represented Armenia in the Junior Eurovision Song Contest 2010 on 20 November 2010.

Before Junior Eurovision

National final 
A submission period for artists was held until 5 August 2010. 31 entries were received, and 25 entries were chosen for the national final.

Quarter-final 1 
The first quarter-final was held on 2 September 2010, hosted by Anahit Sargsyan and Artak Vardanyan. Twelve songs competed and the top eight advanced to the semi-final based on the votes from an "expert" jury.

Quarter-final 2 
The second quarter-final was held on 3 September 2010, hosted by Anahit Sargsyan and Artak Vardanyan. Thirteen songs competed and the top eight advanced to the semi-final based on the votes from an "expert" jury.

Semi-final 
The semi-final was held on 4 September 2010, hosted by Anahit Sargsyan and Artak Vardanyan. Sixteen songs competed and the top ten advanced to the final based on the votes from an "expert" jury.

Final 
The final was held on 5 September 2010, hosted by Anahit Sargsyan and Artak Vardanyan. Ten songs competed and the winner was chosen by a 50/50 combination of televoting and the votes from an "expert" jury.

At Junior Eurovision

Voting

Notes

References

External links 
 Official Armenian Junior Eurovision Site of 2010

Junior Eurovision Song Contest
Armenia
2010